The Premio Carlo d'Alessio is a Group 3 flat horse race in Italy open to thoroughbreds aged four years or older. It is run over a distance of 2,400 metres (about 1½ miles) at Capannelle in May.

History
The race was originally called the Premio Ellington. It was named after Ellington, the sire of a leading 19th-century broodmare in Picciola, Italy.

The Premio Ellington was run over 2,400 metres. For a period it held Group 2 status.

The event was renamed in memory of Carlo d'Alessio, a successful racehorse owner, in 2000. D'Alessio's horses included Bolkonski, Le Moss and Wollow.

The Premio Carlo d'Alessio was extended to 2,800 metres in 2001. It reverted to 2,400 metres in 2005. It was downgraded to Group 3 level in 2006.

Records
Most successful horse since 1977 (2 wins):
 Luso – 1996, 1997

Leading jockey since 1987 (4 wins):
 Dario Vargiu – Exhibit One (2007), Gimmy (2008), Il Fenomeno (2010), Time Chant (2016)

Leading trainer since 1987 (5 wins):
 Luigi Camici – Tony Bin (1987), Knight Line Dancer (1989), Big Tobin (1993), Ivan Luis (1999), Groom Tesse (2006)

Winners since 1987

Earlier winners
 1977: Coltinger
 1978: Rue de la Paix
 1979: Montorselli
 1980: Sifounas
 1981: Ladislao di Oppelm

 1982: Scouting Miller
 1983: Phebis
 1984: Alzao
 1985: Shulich
 1986: Tom Seymour

See also
 List of Italian flat horse races

References

 Racing Post:

 capannelleippodromo.it – Albo d'Oro – Premio Carlo d'Alessio.
 galopp-sieger.de – Premio d'Alessio (ex Premio Ellington).
 horseracingintfed.com – International Federation of Horseracing Authorities – Premio Carlo d'Alessio (2016).
 pedigreequery.com – Premio Carlo d'Alessio – Roma Capannelle.

Open middle distance horse races
Sports competitions in Rome
Horse races in Italy